The following is a list of winners of the Golden Calf for best Short Documentary at the Nederlands Film Festival. This category was first awarded in 1993.

 2022 Eliane Esther Bots - In Flow of Words
 2021 Anne-Marieke Graafmans - Zie je mij, Hoor je mij
 2020 Marina Meijer - Caroussel
 2019 Shamira Raphaëla - De waarheid over mijn vader
 2018 Morgan Knibbe - The Atomic Soldiers
 2017 Elsbeth Fraanje - Snelwegkerk
 2016 Suzanne Raes & Monique Lesterhuis - De tegenprestatie
 2015 Hester Overmars - Verboden Vlucht
 2014 Tijs Tinbergen & Jan Musch - MeesTV: Hoe de koolmees mij gelukkig maakt
 2013 Astrid Bussink - Achter de toren
 2012 Peter Delpeut - Immer Fernweh
 2011 Joost Seelen - Zwarte Soldaten
 2010 Ilse van Velzen & Femke van Velzen - Weapon of War
 2009 Marije Meerman - Wanna Be A Boss
 2008 Melle van Essen & Riekje Ziengs - Landschappen waar niemand van weet (II)
 2007 Simone de Vries - Raak me waar ik voelen kan
 2006 Paul Cohen - Martijn van Haalen - Photo Souvenir
 2005 Meral Uslu - De kinderen van mijn vader
 2004 Leo Wentink - Nijnok
 2003 Louis van Gasteren - The Price of Survival
 2002 Walter Stokman - Ash world suicide
 2001  and Martijn van Haalen - Hollandse helden
 2000 Carin Goeijers - De nieuwerwetse wereld
 1999 Martijn van Beenen - Jackson, the Man with the Box
 1998 Leo de Boer - Engelen des doods
 1997 Merlijn Passier - De tranen van Castro
 1996 Gerard Jacobs - Stalin had een brug beloofd
 1995 Maarten Schmidt & Thomas Doebele - I have a problem, madam
 1994 Johan van der Keuken - Lucebert, tijd en afscheid
 1993 Hillie Molenaar & Joop van Wijk - Isingiro Hospital

Best Short Documentary
Short film awards
Documentary film awards
Incomplete film lists